William Pattison may refer to:

 William Pattison (poet) (1706–1727), English poet
 William Pattison (politician) (1830–1896), Australian politician
 William J. Pattison (1921–1943), US Navy sailor, recipient of the Navy Cross, and namesake of the USS William J. Pattison (APD-104)
 William D. Pattison, American geographer; proposer of the four traditions of geography

See also
 William Pattison Telford (disambiguation)
 William Paterson (disambiguation)
 William Patterson (disambiguation)